This article lists spokesperson of Parti KEADILAN Rakyat (PKR) of Malaysia in the 14th Parliament as of 4th July 2020. The purpose of the spokesperson in parliament is solely to shadow the ministries and portfolios under the Perikatan Nasional government, in other words, to act as a shadow cabinet.

Spokesperson

Deputy Spokesperson 
Besides these Spokesperson, there are also several deputy spokesperson for some portfolios.

References

External links
Jurucakap Parlimen KEADILAN
Senarai Ahli Dewan Rakyat

 
Lists of members of the Parliament of Malaysia